is a Japanese drama series, the 33rd entry of Toei Company's Kamen Rider metaseries and the fourth series to debut during the Reiwa period. The series premiered on September 4, 2022, joining Avataro Sentai Donbrothers and later, Ohsama Sentai King-Ohger in the Super Hero Time lineup following the finale of Kamen Rider Revice.

Summary

The Desire Grand Prix (DGP) is a virtual reality-based survival sports game overseen by a organization of the same name where players must protect the city from the threat of a mysterious enemy called Jyamato. Each participant is bound by the game's rules to continue playing the game until they die or are eliminated while the winner is rewarded with "the right to bring an ideal world to life". In other words, only the true heroes who win the competition can realize their desired reality.

Among the participants are Ace Ukiyo, a mysterious man and undefeated champion of the DGP who competes as Kamen Rider Geats, his rival Michinaga Azuma, a construction worker who competes as Kamen Rider Buffa, graduate student Keiwa Sakurai who competes as Kamen Rider Tycoon, and social media influencer Neon Kurama who competes as Kamen Rider Na-Go. As the group fight the Jyamato to survive and the monsters grow stronger, Ace slowly reveals his reasons for entering the DGP.

The series is divided into arcs, each covering a different season of the Desire Grand Prix:
 (Episode 1): It introduces the main characters and ends with Ace winning and attaining his wish of "Becoming a Celebrity".
 (Episodes 2-9): Keiwa and Neon join the DGP as Kamen Riders while Ace and Michinaga return from the previous season. In the final round, Keiwa is forced to resign after being gravely wounded and Ace wins again, this time using his wish of "Having Girori and Tsumuri (two members of the DGP staff) as part of his family", to investigate further on the DGP and attempt to discover why he can't make his real wish come true, which is to reunite with his long lost mother.
 (Episode 10-16): Due to circumstances involving the Jyamato easily wiping out most of the participants in the first round with one of the survivors unable to continue in the next round, Neon and Keiwa are reinstated in the DGP. The roster is joined by DGP agent Win Hareruya, who is acting on orders from Girori, revealed as the DGP's game master, to remove Ace from the competition for being a threat to the organization. But Win's failure forces Girori to abuse his position from revealing his ability to transform into Kamen Rider Glare to deliberately prolonging the tournament rather than allow Ace to win, which claimed the lives of Michinaga and Win as a result. This results in Girori being removed from the DGP, which is revealed to be an inter-dimensional reality game show, and the season ending with no winners, although Ace, Keiwa and Neon are allowed to keep their Kamen Riders status.
 (Episode 17-24): A new season of the DGP begins with Ace, Keiwa, and Neon joined by two veteran participants, along with a new ruling set by the new game master Chirami that the winner of each round will be determined by popularity rather than performance. Meanwhile, unbeknownst to everyone, Michinaga's prolonged usage of the Zombie Buckle resurrects him as he ends up at a greenhouse where the Jyamato are cultivated by Archimedel. Michinaga learns that the Jyamatos' continuous evolution is the result of being fed the fallen players' ID Cores, the monsters now able to mimic the forms of fallen Kamen Riders. Beroba, a ruthless woman who sponsors the Jyamatos, convinces Michinaga to return to the DGP as one of their represented Riders, but the game is interrupted when Beroba takes the opportunity to attempt to seize the "Goddess of Creation", which is the source of DGP's powers. Leading Ace, Keiwa and Neon, along with their respective supporters Ziin, Kekera and Kyuun (who can also transform into Kamen Riders Ziin, Kekera and Kyuun, respectively) to fight Beroba and the Jamato to stop her. In the occasion, Ace discovers that the DGP supporters are time-travelers from the future, who choose different locations from the past as venues for the DGP. The season also ends up without a winner, this time due to Beroba's interference.
 (Episode 25-present): Beroba creates a new competition called the Jyamato Grand Prix (JGP) with the roles reversed: The Jyamato (including Michinaga who turned into a human-Jyamato hybrid) fighting the Riders to create their ideal world. Ace and the other riders and their supporters join forces to stop the Jyamato and prevent Beroba's ultimate objective which is to obtain the Goddess of Creation's power. Along the way, Ace, Neon and Michinaga’s further origins comes into light.

Production
The Kamen Rider Geats trademark was registered by Toei on May 23, 2022, and published on May 31, 2022.

Geats was officially announced on July 22, 2022. An online production announcement conference introducing the main cast and characters and the artist for the show's theme song was held on August 7, 2022.

Geats was influenced by battle royale-related media such as Fortnite, Apex Legends, and Squid Game as well as past Kamen Rider entry Kamen Rider Ryuki to appeal to their target audience.

The main writer for Geats is Yuya Takahashi, who previously served as the main writer for Kamen Rider Ex-Aid and Kamen Rider Zero-One.

The opening theme song is performed by Koda Kumi and Shōnan no Kaze.

Episodes

Films
Kamen Rider Geats made his first appearance in the feature film Kamen Rider Revice the Movie: Battle Familia.

Movie Battle Royale
 is a crossover film released on December 23, 2022, starring the casts of Geats and Kamen Rider Revice as well as four returning Riders from Kamen Rider Ryuki as supporting cast members to commemorate their series' 20th anniversary. Takamasa Suga, Satoshi Matsuda, and Takashi Hagino of Ryuki reprised their respective roles. The film was written by Yuya Takahashi and Hanta Kinoshita, and directed by Takayuki Shibasaki. The theme song is "Change my future" performed by Koda Kumi.

Cast
: 
: 
: 
: 
: 
: 
: 
: 
: 
: 
: 
: 
: 
: 
: 
: 
: 
: 
: 
: 
: 
Vision Driver Voice, Laser Raise Riser Voice: 
Narration:

Guest cast

: 
: 
: 
: 
: 
: 
TBA (TBA): Apollo Abraham

Theme songs
Opening theme
"Trust・Last"
Lyrics: Shoko Fujibayashi
Composition & Arrangement: Hi-yunk (Back-On)
Artist: Koda Kumi × Shōnan no Kaze
Episode 1 & 16 does not feature the show's opening sequence. This song is used as the ending theme in episode 1 & 16, also as an insert song in episodes 13 and 15.

References

External links
Official website at TV Asahi 
Official website at Kamen Rider Web 
Official Twitter 
Official website for Kamen Rider Geats × Revice: Movie Battle Royal 

2022 Japanese television series debuts
Geats
TV Asahi original programming
Television shows about reincarnation